Gudmund Schütte (17 January 1872– 12 July 1958) was a Danish philologist, historian and writer who specialized in Germanic studies.

Biography
Gudmund Schütte was born at Eskjær, Salling, Denmark on 17 January 1872, the son of landowner Theodor Schütte ((1835–1915)) and Thilia Augusta Marie Cathrine Petersen ((1837–96)). His paternal grandfather, the landowner August Theodor Schütte, was a German immigrant from Perleberg, Germany. In addition to Eskjær, his father also owned the Bygholm estate, and the Sankt Andrä estate in Austria. 

Schütte enrolled at Horsens Statsskole in 1889. While studying German at the University of Copenhagen, Schütte won a university gold medal for a 1897 dissertation on Old English. The same year, Schütte established the Society for Germanic Philology (Danish: Selskabet for germansk filologi). He earned an MA in German philology in 1898, and a PhD in 1907 with the dissertation Oldsagn om Godtjod. 

From 1909 to 1913, Schütte lectured at universities in Berlin and at Aarhus University. In 1915, Schütte inheritated the estate of his father. With his financial independence secured, Schütte was free to pursue his scientific pursuits without being affiliated with any university or spending time on lecturing. In subsequent years, Schütte wrote a number of important works on the early culture and history of the Germanic peoples. His magnum opus, The Gothonic Nations (1929-1933), was published in English in two volumes by Cambridge University Press. He also wrote a number of books and articles on Danish history intended for a popular audience. 

In addition to his scholarly pursuits, Schütte was an active participant in public debate. He was strongly critical of Pan-German aggression towards Denmark, and advocated Danish reclamation of Danish territory annexed by Germany in the Second Schleswig War. Despite opposition from German scholars, Schütte confirmed conclusively that the Jutlandic dialect is a dialect of Danish. He was forceful advocate not only for the rights of the Danish minority in Germany, but also for several other ethnic minorities and stateless nations in Europe. 

Schütte was made a Knight of the Order of the Dannebrog in 1928, and received Dannebrogsmændenes Hæderstegn in 1942. 

Schütte died in Grinderslev, Denmark on 12 July 1958.

Personal life
Schütte married Elsa Margrethe Sidonie Magdalene Johanna Pichler (1880-1953), in Prague on 21 January 1909. She was Bohemian, the daughter of architect Hans P. Pichler (1830-1908) and Sidonia Moritsch (1854-1936). The two were introduced to each other in Prague while Schütte was visiting the Czech Germanist Arnošt Kraus. Gudmund and Johanna had a close relationship, and her death in 1953 was a heavy blow.

Selected

See also
 Birger Nerman
 Sophus Bugge
 Magnus Olsen
 Jan de Vries (philologist)
 Rudolf Much
 Hector Munro Chadwick
 Vilhelm Grønbech

References

Sources

Further reading

External links
 

1872 births
1958 deaths
Academic staff of Aarhus University
20th-century Danish historians
Danish people of German descent
20th-century Danish philologists
Danish writers
Germanic studies scholars
Knights of the Order of the Dannebrog
Old Norse studies scholars
People from Skive Municipality
Writers on Germanic paganism
University of Copenhagen alumni